Argynnis zenobia is a  butterfly found in the  East Palearctic (Amur, Ussuri, China, Tibet) that belongs to the browns family.

Subspecies
A. z. zenobia China, Tibet
A. z. penelope  (Staudinger, [1892])   South Ussuri

Description from Seitz

zenobia Leech (71a). Smaller than the previous species [A.childreni] , particularly the hindwing less large. Shape and upperside almost exactly as in paphia; fiery reddish yellow, the male with black scent-streaks on the two median branches. The underside as in childreni, but the silverbands anastomose in several places. In North and West China and Tibet. — In penelope Stgr. the male has 3 scent-streaks instead of 2 on the forewing, and the female is shaded with dull greyish green nearly as in the valesina-female  of paphia. On the Sutchou, in Amurland and North China. — The butterflies are on the wing in June and July, not being rare in the south and west of the distribution-area, but very rare in the northern districts, on the Ussuri (Doerries).

Biology
The larva feeds on Viola variegata.

See also
List of butterflies of Russia

References

Argynnis
Butterflies described in 1890